These are the official results of the 2013 South American Championships in Athletics which took place on July 5–7 in Cartagena, Colombia.

Men's results

100 meters

Heats – July 5Wind:Heat 1: -1.9 m/s, Heat 2: -0.9 m/s

Final – July 5Wind:+1.3 m/s

200 meters

Heats – July 6Wind:Heat 1: -1.3 m/s, Heat 2: -2.2 m/s

Final – July 6Wind:+1.8 m/s

400 meters

Heats – July 5

Final – July 5

800 meters

Heats – July 6

Final – July 7

1500 meters
July 5

5000 meters
July 7

10,000 meters
July 5

110 meters hurdles
July 5Wind: +1.0 m/s

400 meters hurdles

Heats – July 6

Final – July 6

3000 meters steeplechase
July 7

4 × 100 meters relay
July 6

4 × 400 meters relay
July 7

20,000 meters walk
July 7

High jump
July 6

Pole vault
July 5

Long jump
July 6

Triple jump
July 7

Shot put
July 7

Discus throw
July 5

Hammer throw
July 6

Javelin throw
July 7

Decathlon
July 5–6

Women's results

100 meters

Heats – July 5Wind:Heat 1: -1.8 m/s, Heat 2: -1.6 m/s

Final – July 5Wind:+0.1 m/s

200 meters

Heats – July 6Wind:Heat 1: -1.5 m/s, Heat 2: -2.4 m/s

Final – July 6Wind:+3.4 m/s

400 meters
July 5

800 meters
July 7

1500 meters
July 5

5000 meters
July 7

10,000 meters
July 6

100 meters hurdles
July 5Wind: +2.0 m/s

400 meters hurdles
July 6

3000 meters steeplechase
July 7

4 × 100 meters relay
July 6

4 × 400 meters relay
July 7

20,000 meters walk
July 6

High jump
July 7

Pole vault
July 6

Long jump
July 6

Triple jump
July 5

Shot put
July 6

Discus throw
July 5

Hammer throw
July 5

Javelin throw
July 6

Heptathlon
July 5–6

References

South American Championships in Athletics
Events at the South American Championships in Athletics